José de La Cruz Benitez Santa Cruz (born 3 May 1952 in Asunción), is a former football player who played as a goalkeeper.

Benítez started in the youth divisions of Olimpia Asunción and made his debut with the first team squad in 1971. In 1977, he was transferred to Internacional of Brazil where he won several titles and became a favorite among the fans. In a friendly match on 4 December 1983, Benítez suffered a severe injury after colliding with another player during a game which forced Benítez to end his football career.

He made 94 appearances in the Campeonato Brasileiro for Internacional and Palmeiras.

Benítez made an appearance for the Paraguay national football team in a 1978 FIFA World Cup qualifying match against Brazil.

Career
1971–1977 : Olimpia Asunción – 
1977–1977 : Internacional – 
1978–1978 : Palmeiras – 
1978–1983 : Internacional –

Titles
Under-20 South American Champion: 1971 (with the Paraguay national football team)
Paraguayan League: 1971, 1975 (with Olimpia)
Campeonato Gaúcho: 1978, 1981, 1982, 1983 (with Internacional de Porto Alegre)
Campeonato Brasileiro: 1979 (with Internacional de Porto Alegre)

References

1952 births
Living people
Paraguayan footballers
Paraguayan expatriate footballers
Paraguay international footballers
1975 Copa América players
Club Olimpia footballers
Sport Club Internacional players
Sociedade Esportiva Palmeiras players
Expatriate footballers in Brazil
Paraguayan expatriate sportspeople in Brazil
Association football goalkeepers